La Rousse, also formerly known as La Rousse-Saint Roman (until 2013), is the northernmost ward in the Principality of Monaco. La Rousse is incorporated in the traditional quarter of Monte Carlo. Since 2018, it is home to a police station near the border with France.

Geography 
La Rousse is an administrative constituency; previously, it was a subdivision of the traditional district of Monte Carlo. It is the seventh district of Monaco. It is located near the Larvotto area and has 3,102 inhabitants according to the 2008 census.

It covers an area of 17.68 hectares or 0.1768 square kilometres. La Rousse is bordered by the French Republic to the north and east, Saint Michel and Monte Carlo to the south, and Larvotto to the south and west. It has no direct access to the Mediterranean Sea.

Landmarks
La Rousse is a residential community. Tour Odéon, a mixed-use development, is located on Avenue de l'Annonciade.  At 170 m, Tour Odéon is the tallest structure in Monaco.

Notable residents
Chris Froome (professional road cyclist)

See also
 Municipality of Monaco
 Geography of Monaco

References

Quarters of Monaco
France–Monaco border crossings